Mosa  is a surname. Notable people with the surname include:

 Aníbal Mosa, Chilean entrepreneur
 Edgar Mosa, Portuguese-born American jewelry designer and visual artist
 Taha Mosa, Syrian football player
 Tahiry Mosa, Malagasy politician

See also
 Mosa (disambiguation)
 Musa (name)

Surnames
Arabic-language surnames